Alberta Ramage Neely (1880–1976) was the wife of former Governor of West Virginia Matthew M. Neely and served as that state's First Lady, 1941-1945.

She was born August 27, 1880, at Milford, Pennsylvania.  She graduated from Fairmont Normal School, now Fairmont State University, and attended Randolph-Macon College at Ashland, Virginia and Emerson College of Elocution at Boston, Massachusetts.  In 1903, she married Matthew M. Neely.  As first lady during the U.S. involvement in World War II, she sold war bonds and raised money for servicemen's clubs.  After leaving office, the Nelly's moved to Washington, D.C., where Matthew Neely served in the United States Senate until his death in 1958. She moved to Fairmont, West Virginia, where she died on June 30, 1976.

References

1880 births
1976 deaths
People from Milford, Pennsylvania
First Ladies and Gentlemen of West Virginia
People from Fairmont, West Virginia
Fairmont State University alumni
20th-century American politicians
20th-century American women politicians